Alessandro Triulzi (born 1941 in Rome, Italy) is an Italian historian, Africanist and since 2011 Emeritus Professor of African History and former Vice Director of the African and Arab Studies Department at the Università degli Studi di Napoli "L'Orientale" at Naples. He studied Political Science at the Sapienza University of Rome for a Master's degree in 1966 and obtained a PhD in History at Northwestern University at Evanston, Illinois in 1981. Triulzi performed field work among the Ashanti people in Ghana (1969), and the Berta and Oromo people in Wallaga, West Ethiopia. He worked in Ethiopia, Sudan and Eritrea during 1970–1973, and again in Ethiopia during 1985–2005.

He taught at the University of Perugia (ethnology, 1972–1973) and the University of Naples "L'Orientale" (history of Sub-Saharan Africa, 1973–1985; history and institutions of Ethiopia, 1985–1998). Triulzi was Visiting Professor at the University of Addis Ababa (1994, 1998), the School for Advanced Studies in the Social Sciences in Paris (École des hautes études en sciences sociales, 2004), and Boston University (2008). From 1995 up to 2010 he coordinated the PhD program in African Studies at the University of Naples "L'Orientale".

Triulzi is an Advisory Board Member of AEGIS (Africa-Europe Group for Interdisciplinary Studies), a network of African studies academic centres in Europe. He researched various topics in African studies, ranging from the restructuring of post-colonial African states, colonial photography, the history of Ethiopia, to the recollection of Italy's colonial violence. In 2007 Triulzi was awarded the Premio Giorgio Maria Sangiorgi prize for the History and Ethnology of Africa by the Accademia dei Lincei.

Publications
Triulzi published many scholarly books and research articles on Africa, including:
 Prelude to the history of a no man's land : Bela Shangul, Wallagga, Ethiopia (ca. 1800-1898), Dissertation, Northwestern University 1980.
 with Thomas Leiper Kane Collection (Library of Congress Hebraic Section): Salt, gold, and legitimacy : prelude to the history of a no-man's land, Belā Shangul, Wallaggā, Ethiopia (ca. 1800-1898), Istituto universitario orientale, Napoli 1981.
 Fotografia e storia dell’Africa, Napoli 1995.
 with P. T. W. Baxter, Jan Hultin: Being and becoming Oromo : historical and anthropological enquiries, Nordiska Afrikainstitutet ; Red Sea Press, Inc., Uppsala, Lawrenceville, N.J. 1996.
 with M. Buttino and M. C. Ercolessi (Eds.): Uomini in armi. Costruzioni etniche e violenza politica, Napoli 2000. 
 with W. James, D. Donham, O. Kurimoto (Eds.): Remapping Ethiopia: socialism & after, Oxford 2002. 
 with M.C. Ercolessi (Eds): State, Power and New Political Actors in Postcolonial Africa, Fondazione Giangiacomo Feltrinelli, ANNALI, 38 (2002), Milano 2004.
 with T. Ta'a: Documents for Wallaga history: (1880s-1920s E.C.) Vol. 1 Amharic Texts, Addis Ababa 2004.
 Dopo la violenza. Costruzioni di memoria nel mondo contemporaneo, Napoli 2005. 
 Il ritorno della memoria coloniale, dossier Afriche & Orienti 1, Asmara 2007. 
 with Fikirte Inghida and others: Come un uomo sulla terra = Like a man on Earth, video documentary, Archives of Migrants Memories involving Asinitas, ZaLab and AAMOD. ZaLab, Padua, 2008
 with G. Barrera and Gabriel Tzeggai: Architettura e pianificazione urbana nei fondi dell'IsIAO (Istituto italiano per l'Africa e l'Oriente), Rome 2008. 
 with Marco Carsetti: Come un uomo sulla terra, Rome 2009. 
 with U. Chelati Dirat et al.: Pubblicazioni collettanee recenti: Colonia e postcolonia come spazi diasporici, Carocci 2011. 
 with A. Mignemi, P. Bertella-Farnetti, and R. L. McKenzie: Long Journeys. African Migrants on the Road, Brill 2013.
 L’impero nel cassetto, Mimesis 2013.
 with Arnoldo Mosca Mondadori, Alfonso Cacciatore: Bibbia e Corano a Lampedusa, La Scuola 2014. 
 with P. Di Luca and N. Cangi: Parole oltre le frontiere, Terre di Mezzo 2018.

External links
  Video. LibreriaGRIOT. Duration 4m 0s. Lecture by Triulzi on "Africa between the lines - Biography of a continent" on 4 October 2010. In Italian. Consulted on 29 September 2022.
  Video.Nicola De Carlo. Duration 24m 20s. 13 March 2018. Alessandro Triulzi comments on the amnesia and the repressed historical recollection of the Italian colonial rule in East Africa. In Italian. Consulted on 29 September 2022.
  Video. Duration 64m 26s. Presentation by Alessandro Triulzi at the second session of the Scuola di formazione per attori dell'accoglienza Le strade del mondo 2020, entitled "Memorie migranti", on 8 October 2020.  In Italian. Consulted on 29 September 2022.

References

Sapienza University of Rome alumni
Northwestern University
Academic staff of the Università degli Studi di Napoli "L'Orientale"
Italian Africanists
Italian historians
Living people
1941 births
Academic staff of Addis Ababa University
Academic staff of the University of Perugia
Boston University faculty
Fellows of the British Academy
Slavery in Africa